Eberhard Rüger is a German former ice dancer who represented East Germany. With his skating partner, Annerose Baier, he became a three-time Blue Swords champion (1963, 1965, 1966), the 1968 Prize of Moscow News champion, and an eight-time East German national champion (1962, 1964–1970). They finished in the top ten at eight ISU Championships. Their best continental result, fourth, came at the 1970 European Championships in Leningrad, Soviet Union. They finished as high as sixth at the World Championships, in 1969 (Colorado Springs, Colorado, United States) and 1970 (Ljubljana, Yugoslavia).

Baier/Rüger started their career at SC Wismut Karl-Marx-Stadt. In 1963, they began representing SC Karl-Marx-Stadt.

Rüger was married to German figure skater Gabriele Seyfert from 1972 to 1975. Their daughter, Sheila, was born in 1974.

Competitive highlights 
With Baier

References 

20th-century births
German male ice dancers
Living people
Sportspeople from Chemnitz
Year of birth missing (living people)